Nathan Catt (born 6 January 1988) is an English rugby union player who plays at Prop for Bath Rugby in the Aviva Premiership.

Catt played for England in the 2007 IRB U19 World Championships. In the 2008 U20 Six Nations, Catt started every game, as the England under-20 team won the grand slam. Catt was subsequently a member of the England Under 20 team that reached the final of the 2008 IRB Junior World Championship.

Catt made his England Saxons debut against Portugal in January, 2009.

Catt made his Bath debut in an EDF Energy Cup match against Leicester Tigers. He made his League debut against Worcester Warriors.

Catt was called up to the senior England squad by Eddie Jones in January 2017.

References

External links
Bath profile
The Ten Best England Rugby Prospects
Five England stars of the future

1988 births
Living people
English rugby union players
Bath Rugby players
Rugby union props
People educated at Bath College
Rugby union players from Bristol